Janet Blair (born Martha Janet Lafferty; April 23, 1921 – February 19, 2007) was an American big-band singer who later became a popular film and television actress.

Early years
Janet Blair was born Martha Janet Lafferty on April 23, 1921, in Altoona, Pennsylvania, the daughter of musically oriented parents, Mr. and Mrs. Fred B. Lafferty. Her father led the choir and sang solos in his church, and her mother played both piano and organ. She had a brother, Fred Jr., and a sister, Louise.

Film

Blair began her acting career on film in 1941, being placed under contract to Columbia Pictures. Before that, she was a featured singer in the Hal Kemp Orchestra. During World War II, she appeared as the pin-up girl in the March 1944 issue of Yank magazine. She made a string of successful pictures, although she is today best remembered for playing Rosalind Russell's sister in My Sister Eileen (1942) and Rita Hayworth's best friend in Tonight and Every Night (1945). In the 1947 film The Fabulous Dorseys, Blair returned to her musical roots, portraying a singer. In the late 1940s, Blair had star billing in the crime drama I Love Trouble and the comedy The Fuller Brush Man (both 1948), but was dropped by Columbia and did not return to pictures for several years.

She made a rare dramatic appearance in the British horror film Night of the Eagle (1962). She played the wife of Tony Randall in the comedy Boys' Night Out, a motion picture released in the same year, which starred James Garner and Kim Novak.

Stage
In 1950, Blair took the lead role of Nellie Forbush in the U.S touring production of the stage musical South Pacific, making more than 1,200 performances in three years. "[I] never missed a performance", she noted proudly. During the tour, she also married her second husband, producer-director Nick Mayo, and they became parents of Amanda and Andrew.

Blair also starred in the Broadway comedy A Girl Can Tell in 1953.

Clubs
Blair was a star musical performer in premier nightclubs and supper clubs such as the Empire Room at the Waldorf Astoria in New York.

Television
In 1955, Blair starred as Venus in a live production of One Touch of Venus on NBC-TV.

Blair appeared on television in various variety-show guest appearances—saying, "I think I appeared on the Milton Berle Show more than any other guest"—and hosted, with John Raitt and Edie Adams, the 1958 summer replacement for the Dinah Shore Chevy Show for the vacationing star Dinah Shore. She was a cast member during the 1956–1957 TV season on Caesar's Hour, a comedy-variety series starring Sid Caesar and partially written by Woody Allen.

She appeared as a guest panelist on the June 9, 1957, episode of What's My Line?.

On television in 1971, Blair co-starred with Henry Fonda in The Smith Family, a comedy-drama series on ABC featuring Ron Howard as their son. Her last performance on television was in a 1991 episode of Murder, She Wrote, starring Angela Lansbury.

Radio
On radio, Blair co-starred with George Raft in "Broadway," a 1942 episode of Lux Radio Theatre on CBS.

Recording
Blair recorded an album of standards entitled Flame Out! for the Dico label, which included ballads such as "Don't Explain" and "Then You've Never Been Blue".

Personal life

Blair was married twice, her first to musical arranger and conductor Louis Ferdinand Busch on July 12, 1943, at Lake Arrowhead, California. The two had met four years earlier when Blair sang for Hal Kemp's band and Busch was Kemp's pianist and arranger. They divorced in March 1950. Two years later, Blair wed television producer Nick Mayo, with whom she later had two children, Andrew and Amanda. The couple remained together for 19 years, until their divorce in 1971. Blair was a Republican and campaigned for Thomas Dewey in the 1944 presidential election.
On February 19, 2007, Blair died at the age of 85 at St. John's Health Center in Santa Monica, California, succumbing to complications from pneumonia. She was cremated.

Filmography
Three Girls About Town (1941) – Charity Banner
Blondie Goes to College (1942) – Laura Wadsworth
Two Yanks in Trinidad (1942) – Patricia Dare
Broadway (1942) – Billie Moore
My Sister Eileen (1942) – Eileen Sherwood
Something to Shout About (1943) – Jeanie Maxwell
Once Upon a Time (1944) – Jeannie Thompson
Tonight and Every Night (1945) – Judy Kane
 Tars and Spars (1946) – Christine Bradley
Gallant Journey (1946) – Regina 'Ginny' Cleary
The Fabulous Dorseys (1947) – Jane Howard
I Love Trouble (1948) – Norma Shannon aka Gretchen Breeger
The Black Arrow (1948) – Joanna Sedley
The Fuller Brush Man (1948) – Ann Elliot
Public Pigeon No. 1 (1957) – Edith Enders
Night of the Eagle (US: Burn, Witch, Burn, 1962) – Tansy Taylor
Boys' Night Out (1962) – Marge Drayton
The One and Only, Genuine, Original Family Band (1968) – Katie Bower
Won Ton Ton, the Dog Who Saved Hollywood (1976) – President's Girl 3

Television

The Ford Theatre Hour (1948)
The Chevrolet Tele-Theatre (1949)
The Philco Television Playhouse (1949)
Armstrong Circle Theatre (1954) – Marilyn Wilson
The Elgin Hour (1954) – Lacey Gaddis Clark
The United States Steel Hour (1954) – Peg St. Claire
Goodyear Television Playhouse (1955) 
A Connecticut Yankee (1955, TV) – Sandy
Lux Video Theatre (1955) – Shelly Carnes
Climax! (1955) – Joan Hale
Front Row Center (1955) – Kitty Foyle
One Touch of Venus (1955, TV) – Venus
Ford Television Theatre (1956) – Mary Higgins
Screen Directors Playhouse (1956) – Della Morgan
Caesar's Hour (1956–1957)
Alcoa Theatre (1958) – Lily Adair
Around the World with Nellie Bly (1960 TV movie) – Elizabeth Jane Cochran (Nellie Bly)
The Chevy Mystery Show (1960) – Lisa Townsend
Shirley Temple's Storybook (1960) – Aunt Polly
The Dinah Shore Chevy Show (1960–1961) – Herself 
The Outer Limits (1963) – Lynn Arthur
Bob Hope Presents the Chrysler Theatre (1964) – Polly Emerson
Destry (1964) – Bessie Hawkins
Burke's Law (1963–1964) – Violet / Rina Jacobs
Ben Casey (1966)
Marcus Welby, M.D. (1970–1973) – Mrs. Carter / Ann Ferris
The Smith Family (1971–1972) – Betty Smith
Switch (1977) – Isabel Jensen Craig Harris
Fantasy Island (1980) – Jackie Flynn
The Love Boat (1982) – Mrs. Joan Gerber
Murder, She Wrote (1991) – Bertie (final appearance)

Radio
Lux Radio Theatre (1946 – Gallant Journey) 
This Is Hollywood (1946 – Along Came Jones)

Discography
Flame Out (1959, Dico)

References

Further reading
 Oderman, Stuart, Talking to the Piano Player 2. BearManor Media, 2009. .

External links

 Daily Telegraph obituary
 Photos of Janet Blair in Columbia Pictures 1940's films by Ned Scott

1921 births
2007 deaths
20th-century American actresses
20th-century American singers
20th-century American women singers
Actresses from Pennsylvania
American film actresses
American musical theatre actresses
American television actresses
California Republicans
Deaths from pneumonia in California
Pennsylvania Republicans
People from Altoona, Pennsylvania
21st-century American women